Magghar is the ninth month of the Nanakshahi calendar, which governs the activities within Sikhism. This month coincides with Agrahayana aka Margshirsh in the Hindu calendar and the Indian national calendar, and November and December in the Gregorian and Julian calendars and is 30 days long.

Important events during this month

November
November - Birth Anniversary of Guru Nanak Dev Ji
November 14 (1 Magghar) - The start of the month Maghar
November 24 (11 Magghar) - Shaheedi (martyrdom) of Guru Tegh Bahadur Ji
November 24 (11 Magghar) - Shaheedi of Bhai Mati Das and Bhai Sati Das Ji
November 24 (11 Magghar) - Gur Gadi of Guru Gobind Singh Ji
November 28 (15 Magghar) - Birthday of Sahibzada Zorawar Singh Ji

December
December 12 (29 Magghar) - Birthday of Sahibzada Fateh Singh Ji
December 14 (1 Poh) - The end of the month Maghar and the start of Poh

See also
Punjabi calendar

External links
www.srigranth.org SGGS Page 133
www.sikhcoalition.org

Months of the Nanakshahi calendar
Sikh terminology